Adobe RoboHelp is a help authoring tool (HAT) developed and published by Adobe Inc. for Windows. RoboHelp was created by Gen Kiyooka, and Blue Sky Software released version 1.0 in January 1992.

Blue Sky Software was founded in 1990 and changed its name to eHelp Corporation on 4 April 2000. Macromedia acquired eHelp Corporation on 24 October 2003. Macromedia was, in turn, acquired by Adobe Systems on 3 December 2005. Adobe Systems has developed and released nine successive versions of RoboHelp since 2007.

Features 
Adobe RoboHelp can generate help files in the following file formats:

Revision history 
The version numbering systems used by Blue Sky Software/eHelp Corporation, Macromedia, and Adobe Systems induced some head-scratching, especially among longtime RoboHelp users. For example, the first version of RoboHelp released by Adobe Systems in January 2007 was the 14th version of the software, but Adobe Systems decided to continue the numbering convention from Macromedia and thus gave this version the number 6...and dropped the X used in the previous version, RoboHelp X5. This decision caused confusion because Blue Sky Software released RoboHelp 6.0 in 1998. Adobe Systems continued with that numbering system and used versions 7 through 11 for successive versions of RoboHelp released from September 2007 to January 2014. With the introduction of Adobe RoboHelp 2015 in June 2015, Adobe Systems used a new numbering system with the release year instead of a version number and continues to use this convention with successive versions. This new version numbering system has removed any uncertainty about which version is the most recent. The current version, Adobe RoboHelp 2019, is the 22nd version of the software released in RoboHelp's 26-year history.

Other RoboHelp tools 

 RoboHelp Classic is the classic version of the help authoring tool (HAT) developed and published by Adobe Inc. for Windows. RoboHelp Classic was first distributed in the Technical Communication Suite version 2019.
 RoboHelp Server (formerly RoboSource Control) provides version control for and deployment of online help systems on a network. The current version of Adobe RoboHelp Server, version 10, was released on 12 April 2016.
 RoboScreenCapture is a screen capture tool that can be used for capturing and editing images.

References

External links 

 

Technical communication tools
RoboHelp